The Lizard (Dr. Curtis "Curt" Connors) is a character appearing in American comic books published by Marvel Comics. Created by Stan Lee and Steve Ditko, he first appeared in The Amazing Spider-Man #6 (November 1963) as an enemy of the superhero Spider-Man. While the character has retained this role throughout most of his subsequent appearances, he has also been portrayed as a tragic antihero and occasional ally of Spider-Man. Connors is sometimes an ally of Spider-Man just as himself, and not necessarily as his alter ego.

In the original version of the story, Curt Connors was a geneticist researching the ability of certain reptiles to regrow missing limbs. He developed a lizard DNA-based serum that would allow humans to do the same, and tested it on himself, hoping to regain his missing right arm; instead, he transformed into a feral anthropomorphic lizard. Although Spider-Man was able to undo the transformation, the Lizard remained a part of Connors'  subconscious and would resurface time and time again, often retaining Connors' intelligence and attempting to replace mankind with a race of reptilian creatures like himself. Many stories featuring the Lizard deal with the effects he has on Connors' life and psyche since the latter lives in constant fear that the Lizard will one day completely and irreversibly take over his body. Because of this, he works tirelessly to find a permanent cure for his alternate personality, much to the worry of his wife, Martha Connors, and son, Billy.

The character has appeared in numerous Spider-Man adaptations, including films, animated series, and video games. In live-action, he was played by Dylan Baker in the films Spider-Man 2 (2004) and Spider-Man 3 (2007), and by Rhys Ifans in the film The Amazing Spider-Man (2012) as well as the Marvel Cinematic Universe film Spider-Man: No Way Home (2021). In 2009, the Lizard was ranked IGNs 62nd Greatest Comic Villain of All Time.

Publication history
The Lizard first appeared in The Amazing Spider-Man #6 (November 1963), and was created by Stan Lee and Steve Ditko.

Fictional character biography

Origin
Curtis "Curt" Connors was born in Coral Gables, Florida. He was a gifted surgeon who enlisted in the U.S. Army. He performed emergency battlefield surgery on wounded GIs. However his right arm was terribly injured in a wartime blast, resulting in its amputation.

After his return to civilian life as a research technologist, Connors became obsessed with uncovering the secrets of reptilian limb regeneration. Working from his home in the Florida Everglades with the help of war buddy Ted Sallis, he finally developed an experimental serum taken from reptilian DNA. The serum successfully regrew the missing limb of a rabbit, so then Connors chose to test the serum on himself. He ingested the formula and he did indeed grow a new arm.

However, the formula had an unfortunate side effect: Connors was subsequently transformed into a reptilian humanoid monster. Spider-Man discovered this situation during a trip to Florida to investigate newspaper reports of the Lizard after his employer the Daily Bugle challenged him. After discovering the Lizard's true identity and origin, Spider-Man used Connors' notes to create an antidote to restore him to his human form and mentality. Another attempt to develop this serum for safe use again resulted in Connors transforming into the Lizard, but on this occasion he was saved thanks to his former colleague Professor X and his first team of X-Men, the Beast and the Angel tracking the Lizard down in the swamps so that the Iceman could send him into hibernation long enough to develop a cure.

Life in New York
Later, Curt Connors relocated to New York City. He was able to repay Spider-Man by developing a formula to save May Parker's life after Peter Parker had given his aunt his radioactive blood during a transfusion, unintentionally putting her in mortal peril. It later became clear that the success of Connors' apparent cure from the Lizard persona was short-lived. A repeating pattern soon occurred, with stress or a chemical reaction turning Connors into the Lizard, Spider-Man fighting him, and then forcing him to swallow the antidote to reverse the transformation until the next time. A second personality had formed with the Lizard, one with the familiar goal shared by many villains of taking over the world. The Lizard envisioned a world where all humans had been transformed into (or replaced by) super-reptiles like himself. Despite the Lizard's overall hatred of humans, he was often shown to be unwilling to harm his wife Martha or young son Billy.

As Connors, he aided Spider-Man in defeating the Rhino by developing a formula to dissolve the Rhino's bulletproof hide, but accidentally transformed himself into the Lizard due to exposure to the chemicals needed to create the formula and was restored by Spider-Man. Connors was later abducted and forced to create a rejuvenation serum for Silvermane. However, the stress from this caused Connors to again transform; the Lizard then battled Spider-Man and the Human Torch, and was restored to normal once again by Spider-Man.

During another encounter with Spider-Man after Peter's attempts to remove his powers resulted in him growing four extra arms, a bite from Morbius endowed the Lizard with Connors' personality via the infection of a strange enzyme. Connors then synthesized an antidote for himself and Spider-Man using the Morbius enzyme. Curt Connors later aided Spider-Man, Ka-Zar, and the Black Panther against Stegron the Dinosaur Man. After the apparent death of the Jackal, Dr. Connors determined that Spider-Man was not a clone. Later, the Lizard battled both Stegron and Spider-Man after Stegron kidnapped Billy Connors. For a time, Peter Parker worked as a teaching assistant to Dr. Connors at Empire State University, although Connors had no idea that Peter was actually Spider-Man. During this time, Spider-Man and Connors dealt with one of Connors' previous experiments in the form of the Iguana.

During the first of the Secret Wars, the Lizard refused to participate on either side of the conflict. Although he was collected by the Beyonder along with other villains, he broke away from the main group after the first battle to settle in a swamp, where he befriended the Wasp, who had helped him treat an injury that he had sustained in the first battle. After the Lizard was blasted by the magic of the Enchantress, he reverted to human form.

After Connors' return from this event, his wife Martha, unable to take it anymore since Connors had said that he had been permanently cured, only to disappear for many days and then return home in tattered clothing with no plausible explanation as to where he had been, took their son Billy and separated from Curt. The Lizard had apparently been affected by inter-dimensional teleportation so that Connors' mind presided over the Lizard, and he battled the Owl alongside Spider-Man. However, mystical activity during the Inferno crisis once again brought the Lizard's bestial nature to the fore, and Spider-Man cured him again.

The 1990s through 2007: Civil War
Connors then tried to straighten out his life and control the Lizard, with some degree of success. This ended when the villainess Calypso used her voodoo magic to take control of the Lizard (during the Torment storyline) for her own purposes, reducing him to a mindless, savage state. After a series of bloody battles, the Lizard and Calypso were defeated by Spider-Man, and Spider-Man assumed that he perished under Calypso's spell. Connors once again gained control of the Lizard's mind and body, although it was very weak. Curt carried out a plan to cure himself temporarily, after which he voluntarily submitted to incarceration in the supervillain prison the Vault. When Calypso forced the transformation and attempted to control the Lizard once again, the creature killed her and escaped from the Vault. After this escape, the Lizard fell and sank into a quicksand pit during a battle in the Everglades with Spider-Man and the bounty hunter Warrant and was believed to have died.

Later, a huge bestial Lizard appeared, shortly after Connors was called in to investigate Peter Parker's sudden sickness (the result of Peter's recently lost spider-powers returning). Spider-Man (Ben Reilly) realized that not only had the Lizard survived, but revealed later his new monstrous transformation seemed to be permanent and the personality of Curt Connors appeared completely lost. However, when this savage mindless Lizard later unexpectedly encountered Dr. Connors himself while Connors was helping Peter, Curt became the true Lizard once again and saved his family by killing the "Lizard-clone". It was revealed that the Lizard-clone was a scientific accident resulting from an experimental formula being tested on a piece of the original Lizard's tail, which had then grown into a fully formed second creature.

Although reunited after Curt's apparent death, Martha and Billy were diagnosed with cancer after being exposed to carcinogens from living near an industrial lab in Florida. Spider-Man assisted Curt in successfully forcing Monnano, the lab's owner, to admit culpability, but Martha died from her cancer. Billy recovered but remained bitter towards his father. Curt's guilt and internalized anger led him to become the Lizard once again, and once human, Curt attempted a bank robbery so that he would be sent to prison. After a short-lived term, Connors was released and changed into the Lizard once more, this time due to a scheme by Norman Osborn to form the Sinister Twelve to kill Spider-Man. The Sinister Twelve were defeated and captured by the combined forces of Daredevil, the Fantastic Four, and the Avengers.

The Lizard resurfaced to face Spider-Man with the aid of Billy Connors, who was changed into an adolescent Lizard by his father. Both the Lizard and his son were captured and reverted. Billy's transformational ability has been ignored since. A new Sinister Six team, including new member the Lizard, appeared during the superhero Civil War, but it was stopped by Captain America and his Secret Avengers.

Post-Civil War, Curt Connors aided Spider-Man in developing a cure for the victims of Mister Hyde who were mutated with unstable versions of Spider-Man's powers. Dr. Connors has also monitored the progress of the hero Komodo, a female grad student who stole a sample of Connors' Lizard formula. She modified the formula for her own DNA to grow back her missing legs and to give herself reptilian powers.

Brand New Day (2008) and beyond
Doctor Curt Connors appeared in the 2008 Brand New Day storyline, where he experimented with animal stem cells as well as aiding forensic specialist Carlie Cooper. The third Freak mistook Connors' stem cells experiment for drugs. Connors helped Spider-Man defeat the Freak during their second encounter.

During the events of The Gauntlet, Curt Connors was working for the pharmaceutical company Phelcorp under executive Brian King. Connors had lost custody of his son, Billy, and started hearing the voice of the Lizard persona goading him to let it have control. After Connors' assistant slept with King, Connors began struggling to contain the Lizard, ultimately losing control when King stopped him from taking a dose of his Lizard suppressing antidote. When Connors changed into the Lizard, he devoured King as a rival male. Knowing that the Lizard has targeted Connors' son Billy in the past, Peter Parker decides to protect Billy and swings to his foster parents' home. There, he finds that Billy was kidnapped and his new parents are being held hostage by Ana Kravinoff. Ana had left Billy in an alley, where the Lizard ate him, the trauma of which functionally destroyed the Connors persona. Without Connors internally warring with the Lizard, he enters a metamorphasis, emerging in a new form, sporting a leaner physique, long brown spikes on its head, spikes on its right forearm, human intelligence, and the ability to telepathically communicate with the underdeveloped "lizard hindbrain" portion of human brains. He demonstrated the latter ability by triggering the instinctual prey response of Spider-man's lizard brain, temporarily overwhelming the superhero and causing him to flee in terror. Back on the street, the Lizard mentally triggered the lizard portion of numerous people's brains, causing them to behave in savage and often violent ways. Away from the Lizard, Spider-Man ingested Connors' Lizard suppressant formula, temporarily making him immune to the Lizard's mind controlling powers. Spider-Man then injected the Lizard with some of the formula, hoping that Connors would be able to resume control. Although Connors is no longer present, the formula does increase the prominence of the Lizard's "monkey brain", aka the human intelligence portion of its brain. This causes him to consider (and regret) some of his actions, including killing Billy and trying to make people embrace their lizard instincts. Reverting most of the people he had affected with his telepathic powers, The Lizard disappeared into the sewers after the fight.

During the Origin of the Species, the Lizard joined Doctor Octopus's supervillain team and stole Menace's baby. As Doctor Octopus and Spider-Man fought within the Lizard's hideout, the Lizard at first attacked Spider-Man, but then gladly returned the baby. He revealed that he already took a blood sample from the baby and found out that Norman Osborn was not the father; therefore, the baby was useless to him and all of the villains. Doctor Octopus, angry about the Lizard's hypnotism obstructing his intellect, attacked him while Spider-Man escaped with the baby. Both Doctor Octopus and the Lizard survived this fight.

A short time later, while investigating kidnappings in New York, the X-Men found themselves working with Spider-Man after they discovered that the abductor is the Lizard, who had been turning the victims into lizard people, while maintaining his control over the city's reptile population. The X-Men and Spider-Man discovered that the Lizard was being used by the Dark Beast, who had given the Lizard his 'reptilian shift' abilities by using a machine. During the battle, the Lizard shifted Gambit, Storm, and Wolverine into lizard people. Emma Frost and Spider-Man escaped the machine's effects, released the Lizard and used him to defeat the Dark Beast, who was arrested while the Lizard escaped.

Sometime later, Dr. Michael Morbius discovered that the Lizard had used DNA samples from Billy Connors' corpse to restore Curt Connors to humanity. Unfortunately, the Lizard's psyche was still present and was pretending to be Connors so that he would be left alone. The Lizard/Connors released blood into the air supply to provoke Morbius into attacking the other lab workers. The Lizard/Connors then tried to recreate his original Lizard formula so that he could change again, but Morbius' cure instead only allowed him to regrow his missing arm. The Lizard/Connors then injected Max Modell and other Horizon Lab personnel with his formula to discover how to "cure" himself. Attempting to appear to be the "normal" Connors, the Lizard/Connors cut off his regrown limb, but the Lizard began to appreciate human life, to the point that when he found the correct Lizard serum, he contemplated remaining human, but he took the cure when Spider-Man arrived and threatened him with custody. This resulted in yet another streamlined, new form. A new cure was developed for the lab employees that he had changed, but this formula failed on the Lizard's new form; he was instead knocked out and taken to the Raft. Visiting him in the Raft, Spider-Man was unaware that the serum had restored Connors' psyche and Connors remained in prison willingly, as he felt that he deserved it for his actions as the Lizard.

During the "Dying Wish" storyline, Peter Parker (whose mind was trapped within Doctor Octopus' dying body) was freed from the Raft by the Trapster, Hydro-Man, and the Scorpion. The Trapster offered to free the Lizard, but Connors declined. When Morbius the Living Vampire managed to escape his cell, the Lizard pointed out that he still had nowhere to go. For unknown reasons, Morbius then freed the Lizard.

The Lizard was then seen back in his cell, being one of the few inmates left to be transported out of the decommissioned Raft. When Alistair Smythe attempted an escape from the Raft, he temporarily shut down the Raft's power, letting the Lizard out of his cell. The Lizard protected J. Jonah Jameson from the Scorpion, revealing that he had the mind of Curt Connors, and that he "will never let the monsters win again." Jameson defended the Lizard from the Raft's warden, calling him a hero, and protesting the use of a restraining device, though the Lizard himself preferred to be cautious. During Smythe's final escape attempt, the Lizard was impaled through the shoulder, but survived.

As part of the "All-New, All-Different Marvel" as part of the lead-up to the "Dead No More: The Clone Conspiracy" storyline, the Lizard was shown at the Andry Corrections Facility. He was escorted to the visitor's room and his restraints were removed. After the guards left the visitor's room, the Lizard met the mysterious red-suited man where he claimed to have met Curt Connors before. The Lizard detected familiar scents accompanying the man, scents that could not be there, and warned him not to toy with the Lizard. The red-suited man replied that he was not the Lizard; inside he was Curt Connors, a model prisoner who saved Mayor J. Jonah Jameson and various civilians before and was trapped in a monster's body. The Lizard lashed out at him, demanding to know how can the people that he was smelling be there. The man said that the Lizard had abilities that he could use and if he escaped and joined him, he could give him anything. He snapped his fingers and Martha Connors and Billy Connors stepped forward, where they were somehow alive. The red-suited man asked if they have a deal. The Lizard tearfully accepted his deal. It was revealed that the revived Martha Connors and Billy Connors were clones that the red-suited man had gathered to grow clones with false memories that span all the way to their deaths. The Lizard and a depowered Electro were later sprung from Andry Corrections Facility by the Rhino on the red-suited man's behalf. The Lizard worked with the Jackal on a procedure that would repower Electro. The first time it was interrupted, the Lizard was present when the Jackal summoned a somehow-revived Francine appears to convince Maxwell to go through with it. The second time it was interrupted was when Martha Connors informed everyone present about a fire in Edmond, Oklahoma that neither of them was responsible for. While escaping from New U Technologies, Spider-Man and Spider-Woman of Earth-65 quickly incapacitate the Lizard. When Doctor Octopus pulled a switch which activated the Carrion Virus in all of the clones and caused them to start rapidly decaying, the Lizard saw that Martha Connors and Billy Connors were affected. During the ensuing battle, the Lizard escaped with Martha and Billy as he vowed to find a way to keep them from dying. In the sewers of San Francisco, the Lizard saved Martha and Billy Connors from the Carrion Virus by injecting them with the Lizard formula, turning his wife and son into lizard people like himself.

Connors was later shown having returned to Empire State University, now using a special chip implanted in the back of his neck to control his Lizard persona, with the chip acting as an inhibitor that stopped him from attacking humans. Teaching once again, Connors offered to support Peter Parker's efforts to re-apply for his doctorate after he was academically disgraced by accusations of plagiarism of Otto Octavius' thesis since Doctor Octopus' mind was in Peter's body at the time. The inhibitor proved to be a disadvantage when Connors' class was attacked by the Taskmaster and the Black Ant and he could not defend himself.

When Connors was captured by Kraven the Hunter as part of his organized hunt for various animal-themed villains, he was locked in a cell with Spider-Man while the two of them watched live footage of the Black Cat and the Lizard-esque Billy Connors being hunted, with Billy admitting that he actually remembers his original death. Faced with a threat to his son, Connors asked Spider-Man to tear out the inhibitor chip so that he could rescue his son, despite the risk of this action leaving Connors paralyzed at best, the two unaware that Kraven had set the situation up precisely to force Spider-Man into a position where he would become the ruthless warrior that Kraven believes that he 'should' be. However, Connors managed to maintain control and retrieve Billy without killing anyone.

In a prelude to the "Sinister War" storyline, Doctor Octopus coerced Curt Connors into using the Isotope Genome Accelerator on himself which separates him from his Lizard side. Kindred then completed the Sinister Six by having Mysterio join him as Kindred notes that his endgame with Spider-Man is approaching. Spider-Man found Connors in his wrecked lab as he was informed on what happened. Peter then took Connors home in the sewer to recover with his family. Spider-Man suspects that Doctor Octopus is forming his latest incarnation of the Sinister Six. Lizard's Isotope Genome Accelerator duplicate and the rest of the Sinister Six proceeded to compete with the other villains that Kindred enlisted to take out Spider-Man. Doctor Octopus managed to have all the villains subdued when he hacked into Black Ant's helmet by changing the setting to centipedes which affected the centipedes in every villains' head.

During the "Beyond" storyline, Maxine Danger of the Beyond Corporation sent Misty Knight and Colleen Wing into the sewers where they apprehended Lizards' Isotope Genome Accelerator duplicate. Upon being taken to Beyond Corporation's secret facility on Staten Island, the genetic template of Lizard's Isotope Genome Accelerator duplicate were used with the genetic template of Morbius the Living Vampire to create a binary clone called Creature Z which looks like a white version of Lizard with the fangs and wings of a vampire bat. After the facility was destroyed by Monica Rambeau and the Machine Man Imposter and Creature Z was overloaded with the blood it sucked out, Lizard's Isotope Genome Accelerator duplicate was rescued by Morbius. As Morbius planned to work with him in curing their conditions, he is unaware that the Lizard he rescued is an Istopte Genome accelerator duplicate.

Powers and abilities
Dr. Curtis Connors gave himself superhuman powers as a result of exposure to the Lizard Formula, allowing him to transform into the Lizard. In human form, he has none of his superhuman powers, but he is highly intelligent and a well known scientist in fields of genetics, physics, biochemistry and herpetology.

When Connors is transformed into the Lizard, his strength is increased to superhuman levels. Likewise, his speed, stamina, agility, and reflexes are also raised to a level equivalent to that of Spider-Man. He can also scale walls using a combination of his sharp claws and micro-scales on his hands and feet that create molecular friction like those of a gecko. He is highly resistant to injury due to his thick scaly hide, allowing him to resist punctures and lacerations from ordinary weapons and lower-caliber firearms. In addition, the Lizard has highly enhanced healing abilities which allow him to quickly recover from grievous wounds, including regenerating lost limbs. He also has a powerful tail which he can whip at high speeds. The Lizard has razor-sharp teeth set in muscular jaws that can deal a lethal bite (the latter is established in the Lizard's later appearances; in his earlier appearances he seems to have no teeth at all). Like a reptile, he has cold-blooded characteristics and is therefore sensitive to drops in temperature; a sufficiently cold environment will cause his metabolism to slow drastically and become dormant if he is exposed to cold temperatures for too long.

The Lizard can mentally communicate and command all reptiles within a mile of himself via limited telepathy. He has also on at least one occasion secreted powerful pheromones which caused nearby humans to behave violently. Post-Brand New Day, a further enhancement of his telepathy granted him the power of telepathically compelling humans to act out their primal urges, by suppressing emotional control in their amygdala (the "lizard brain").

Based on various physiological and environmental factors, the Lizard's intelligence can range from bestial and animalistic to normal human intelligence. The Lizard personality has most often manifested with human intelligence, capable of speech and higher reasoning, although some versions have been more feral than others. During the "Secret Wars" in particular, he appeared less ruthless than his normal portrayal, showing concern for Volcana and the Wasp after they showed him kindness despite his usual disdain for humans. However, even when operating at the level of a human, the Lizard is rarely as intelligent as Dr. Connors, showing on many occasions an inability to understand his human self's work and use it to further his own ends despite his best efforts.

The Lizard has apparently "destroyed" the Curt Connors persona, but has subsequently begun to display some of Connors's human emotions. In contrast to his previously feral nature, he has also shown sufficient intellectual capabilities to replicate Connors' work for himself, although he is still hampered by his inability to fully comprehend human emotions.

Continuity 
In a 2004 story arc entitled Lizard's Tale, written by Paul Jenkins in the Spectacular Spider-Man comic book, it was revealed that the Lizard persona was not a separate personality from Dr. Connors after all — Curt had been consciously controlling his reptilian alter ego all along. Furthermore, Connors was shown to know that Peter Parker was Spider-Man, despite the discovery of the secret identity never being explained or depicted. The story ended with Dr. Connors deliberately getting himself sent to prison and hoping the Lizard would not be unleashed again. The Lizard's next appearance after this was as a member of the Sinister Twelve, where he showed no indication of being controlled by the mind of Dr. Connors. Although the idea of Connors controlling the Lizard was subsequently ignored, when the Lizard's mind was briefly trapped in Connors' human form, he attempted to mutate the staff of Horizon Labs into lizard people like himself, with none of the other lizards demonstrating the same hostility to humans as the Lizard, prompting Spider-Man to speculate that the Lizard's anti-human traits came from Connors' anger at the world for his lost arm and family rather than the Lizard being completely separate from Connors.

Another continuity-related issue involves Connors' son Billy. Unlike many other Marvel Comics children, he has not appreciably grown up since the comics' stories of the 1960s. Billy's visible age also seems to waver back and forth between approximately eight and 13 years old, depending on the particular comic artist drawing the character.

Other versions

Amazing Spider-Man: Renew Your Vows 
In this reality, Billy used the Lizard serum on himself and is mutated like his father (though he is not as in control of himself as Curt). Curt and Billy try breaking into high tech facilities in an attempt to find Regent's tech to turn Billy back to normal, but are thwarted by Spider-Man and his daughter Spiderling. After defeating the reptilian father and son at Oscorp, Spider-Man contacts the Fantastic Four for help in curing Billy's condition.

Ultimate Marvel
The one comic storyline to date featuring the Ultimate Marvel universe version of Lizard appeared in Ultimate Marvel Team-Up #10. The character has appeared in a few subsequent issues of Ultimate Spider-Man, but only in flashbacks and dream sequences. Lizard appears to be based on a basilisk lizard in design and has been presented as being less intelligent than the original Marvel iteration. Dr. Curt Conners is a noted geneticist who lost his right arm under unrevealed circumstances. He dedicated himself to finding a means of restoring lost limbs by studying the regenerative capabilities of reptiles. However, after five years without major breakthroughs, his sponsors were on the verge of cutting his funding. Drowning his disappointment with alcohol, a drunken Conners injected himself with an experimental serum in a desperate attempt to achieve results. The serum regenerated his right arm, but also transformed Conners into an inhuman reptilian creature. Seeking refuge in the sewers, he became an urban legend dubbed "the Lizard" by the press. Spider-Man sympathetically sought out Lizard who attacked the young hero until Man-Thing happened upon the scene and restored Conners to human form. Conners' restored right arm soon withered and died. However, his DNA remained irreparably damaged with dormant potential for further transformation. Conners cut himself off from his wife and son out of fear for their safety.

Dr. Conners also unintentionally created the Ultimate version of Carnage using DNA from Spider-Man and based on an analysis of his old friend Richard Parker's work on the Venom symbiote. Due to the ensuing chaos, he was arrested and Stark Industries canceled their financial support of his experiments, but his assistant Ben Reilly still had one sample of Spider-Man's DNA, setting the stage for the Clone Saga. He was last seen in Ultimate Spider-Man #127, where Dr. Conners was pardoned and recruited by S.H.I.E.L.D. where he and Tony Stark are at when the Triskellion was blown apart by Norman Osborn during an escape.

Early details of the character's history match his 616 counterpart, with him studying reptiles to fix his arm (the cause of this has yet to be revealed), and the condition of him leaving his wife and son (Doris and Timmy) out of fear, thereby turning to alcoholism.

Howard the Human
During the Secret Wars storyline, the Battleworld domain of New Quack City has a version of Curt Connors in it. This Curt Connors is a tough, anthropomorphic lizard who is a bartender at a place that Howard the Human frequently visits.

Exiles
The reality-hopping heroic team, the Exiles, once found themselves on an alternate earth where Connors' experiment (in this world for a left arm rather than a right) had taken a different turn. Finding himself as the Lizard, Curt felt the need to "reproduce" by immediately injecting the Lizard formula into other people. He infected his family and they infected others, all feeling the urge to spread the transformation into lizard people. The forces of this particular world eventually managed to restrain the infected lizard people behind miles-long, man-made walls. When the Exiles visited this world, they discovered that Connors — having turned back into his human form a year ago — was intending to detonate a nuclear bomb in an abandoned submarine to wipe out the lizard people, but they were able to talk him down by arguing that the radioactive fallout would cause more damage, particularly since the lizard people were now mere herbivores (albeit partly because of the absence of other kinds of meat). Grief-stricken over what had become of his life, Connors subsequently killed himself.

Marvel 1602
In the Marvel 1602 reality, Curtis Connors is a philosopher who was infected with the bubonic plague. He created an elixir that transformed him into a reptilian creature that resembled a Velociraptor, but retained his mind. He worked with Baron Victor Octavius to capture the Spider.

Marvel Noir
In the Marvel Noir reality, Curt Connors is an assistant to Dr. Otto Octavius. They operated in an abandoned hospital building on Ellis Island, where they secretly used kidnapped African Americans as specimens by turning them into mindless slaves. It is unknown what happened to Connors after federal authorities raided the hospital, though he was presumably arrested along with Octavius' associates.

Marvel Zombies
In Marvel Zombies, the Lizard, like almost every other hero and villain, has become a zombie. This particular incarnation of the Lizard is apparently destroyed when he is blasted apart by several cosmic-powered heroes while fighting (and eating) Galactus.

MC2
The Connors family appear in the first story of the Mr. and Mrs. Spider-Man series, set in the MC2 universe. Mary Jane comforts a distraught Martha when Curt goes missing again, whilst Peter, now a parent to his infant daughter May ("Mayday"), is more hesitant than before to become Spider-Man. He is eventually encouraged by his wife to track down and prevent the Lizard's latest rampage.

Old Man Logan
During the "Old Man Logan" storyline taking place on Earth-807128, Lizard is revealed to have claimed territory in Florida where he has taken the name of Lizard King.

In the pages of "Dead Man Logan" that takes place on Earth-21923, it is shown that Joseph Manfredi and his gang work for Lizard where one of his men has been transformed with the Lizard formula. After Logan slices off one man's arm and another man's leg while claiming their truck as his transportation, Manfredi arranges for them to be taken to Lizard so that he can treat them. Lizard was shown to have patched up the one who lost his leg and use the Lizard formula on the one who lost his arm.

Spider-Gwen
On Earth-65 where Gwen Stacy became Spider-Woman after being bitten by the spider, Peter Parker attempts to exact revenge on those who bullied him, becoming this universe's version of the Lizard. Gwen subdues him, but Peter ended up dying towards the end of the battle due to his use of the chemicals that transformed him. Spider-Woman is blamed for his death, causing an uproar for her arrest, led by J. Jonah Jameson, with Peter essentially becoming Gwen's Uncle Ben, serving as inspiration of the need to use her powers to help others.

It is later revealed that Curt Connors was a teacher at Gwen's high school and was studying Lizard genetics, possibly being involved in Peter's transformation into the Lizard and the recent sightings of multiple Lizard-people wreaking havoc in the city.

Marvel Age
Lizard's history is the same in this reality. Spider-Man went to Florida to investigate the "Lizard Man" sightings. Spider-Man meets Martha Connors and learns that Lizard is her husband Dr. Curt Connors. After making an antidote, Spider-Man ensnares Lizard and uses the antidote to restore him to Curt Connors. Peter Parker later told J. Jonah Jameson that the "Lizard Man" was a hoax.

Captain America and Black Widow
A version of Lizard who wore the tentacles of Doctor Octopus, was brainwashed by Vennema Multiversal, but was freed and joined the battle against them.

In other media

Television
 The Lizard appears in Spider-Man (1967), voiced by Gillie Fenwick. This version is named Dr. Curt Conner and has both of his arms. In the episode "Where Crawls the Lizard", he works on a serum intended to cure 'swamp fever', but it transforms him into the Lizard Man instead. He plots to create an army of lizard people like himself and take over the world until Spider-Man foils his plans and restores him to his human form. In "Conner's Reptiles", Conner experiments with increasing reptiles' intelligence, but inadvertently turns a regular alligator into another humanoid lizard called Reptilla (voiced by Paul Soles). It kidnaps Conner, but Spider-Man rescues the latter and restores Reptilla.
 The Lizard appears in the Spider-Man (1981) episode "Lizards, Lizards, Everywhere", voiced by Corey Burton. This version is never identified as Curt Connors nor seen in his human form.
 Dr. Curt Connors / Lizard appears in Spider-Man: The Animated Series, voiced by Joseph Campanella. This version maintains his genius-level intellect as the Lizard coupled with his alter ego's savage mindset from the comics. In the pilot episode "Night of the Lizard", Connors transforms into the eponymous character after using himself as a test subject for his experiments with lizard DNA in the hopes of regenerating his right arm. While transformed, the Lizard abducts his wife Margaret and takes his captive to a hideout in the sewers to help him transform New York's population into lizards like himself, only to be defeated by Spider-Man and restored to his human form. In "The Lizard King", a number of sewer lizards become mutated by Connors's chemicals and abduct him, who transforms into the Lizard and becomes their king. With Debra Whitman's help, Margaret and Mary Jane Watson create a cure, which Spider-Man administers, restoring all the mutated lizards to their original forms. In the three-part episode "Secret Wars", the Lizard is among several supervillains that the Beyonder transports to an alien planet to engage in a war against a team of heroes led by Spider-Man, though the Lizard defects to the heroes' side after Iron Man and Mister Fantastic use a machine to allow Connors's mind to take control of the Lizard's body. Once the war is over, Connors is returned to Earth with no memory of what happened.
 Dr. Curt Connors / Lizard appears in the Spider-Man: The New Animated Series episode "Law of the Jungle", voiced by Rob Zombie. This version is more serious and colder than other versions, lost his right arm as a result of an accident while testing Oscorp Industries' Wide Area Explosive Fragmentation Round (WAFER), and is Peter Parker's science teacher at Empire State University. Connors intentionally transforms into the Lizard to exact revenge, maintaining his intelligence and ability to speak. Following a battle with Spider-Man, the Lizard is left hanging by webbing from a helicopter. Spider-Man tries to reason with him, but the Lizard accidentally cuts the web and falls to fall to his apparent death.
 Dr. Curt Connors / Lizard appears in The Spectacular Spider-Man, voiced by Dee Bradley Baker. This version maintains his intelligence, but has lost his right arm during his time as a combat medic which he has replaced with a mechanical prosthetic arm. Additionally, he and his wife Martha Connors play a supporting role in season one and work at Empire State University, where they employ Eddie Brock as a lab assistant and Peter Parker and Gwen Stacy as interns. The Lizard is seen with a savage mindset, but is defeated by Spider-Man. In season two, the Connorses lab falls under Miles Warren's control by threatening to expose the experiments behind the Lizard to which Curt and his family move away.
 Dr. Curt Connors / Lizard appears in Ultimate Spider-Man, voiced by Tom Kenny in season one, and Dee Bradley Baker for the rest of the series. This version is a S.H.I.E.L.D. scientist. After being forced to amputate his right arm following the Green Goblin's attack on the Helicarrier during the season one finale, the Lizard is introduced in season two. Connors and Spider-Man retrieve several of Doctor Octopus's animal DNA formulas for Connors to study for the potential in medicine. He injects himself with several doses of the lizard formula, which restores his right arm, but mutates him into the more feral Lizard in the process until Spider-Man helps restore the Lizard to his human form. Unfortunately, he is abducted and forcibly turned back into the Lizard by Doctor Octopus via a mind control device to have him join the Sinister Six. The group is defeated by Spider-Man and the S.H.I.E.L.D. trainees and arrested, but the Lizard manages to escape. The Lizard steals equipment from Midtown High School to render his human side dormant which he succeeds at and escapes once more despite Spider-Man and retired S.H.I.E.L.D. agent turned janitor Stan's interference. However, Spider-Man discovers Connors' antidote created before the Lizard's consciousness took over and cures him. Following this, Connors makes minor appearances throughout seasons three and four, with his most notable appearance being where he is again transformed into the Lizard by Doctor Octopus' spy, and granted the ability to mutate others into anthropomorphic lizards via his bite. Spider-Man eventually creates an antidote for the Lizard and all those infected by him.
 Season four features a vampiric alternate reality version of the Lizard known as the Lizard King, the ruler of a vampire-infested world. With Blood Spider as his only opposition, the Lizard King collaborates with Wolf Spider in a plot to obtain a Siege Perilous fragment to block out the sun so his vampires can rule the Earth. However, Spider-Man and Kid Arachnid combine Blood Spider's cured blood sample with the Siege Perilous piece and a UV Light to cure everyone, including the Lizard King.
 In the two-part series finale, Crossbones is mutated into a mind-controlled Lizard by Doctor Octopus to join the Superior Sinister Six, but Spider-Man is able to eventually cure and free him from Doctor Octopus's control.
 The Lizard appears in the Marvel Disk Wars: The Avengers episode "Re-enforcement Hawkeye".
 Dr. Curt Connors / Lizard appears in Spider-Man (2017), voiced by Yuri Lowenthal. This version has less morals compared to other versions as he works for Norman Osborn. Introduced in season one, Connors is an Oscorp scientist when he injects himself with reptile DNA and transforms into the Lizard while being manipulated by Osborn. He ends up transformed into a giant lizard monster until the Spider-Men cure him. In season three, Connors is hired by Max Modell as Horizon High's bio-mechanics teacher while secretly collaborating with Osborn in exchange for a cure for his condition as the Lizard. He assists Spider-Man, Modell and Grady Scraps in defeating the Technovore before framing the former for the incident. After framing Modell for crimes involving the Venom symbiote and forcing Spider-Man to unmask himself before the school board, Connors is Horizon High's interim headmaster. The Spider-Team expose the conspiracy and Connors learns there never was a cure as he turns into the Lizard and attacks the Dark Goblin in anger before retreating.

Film
 Dr. Curt Connors appears in Sam Raimi's live-action Spider-Man trilogy, portrayed by Dylan Baker. While the character does not become the Lizard in this franchise, he still lacks his right arm as in the comics. This version is a Columbia University physics professor who is concerned for Peter Parker's well-being and academic performance in his quantum mechanics course as well as a former classmate and friend of Otto Octavius's while he was in college. In 2007, Raimi expressed interest in portraying Connors' transformation into the Lizard. Baker and producer Grant Curtis were also enthusiastic about the idea. As disagreements between Sony and Raimi threatened to push the film off the intended May 6, 2011 release date however, Sony Pictures announced in January 2010 that plans for Spider-Man 4 had been cancelled due to Raimi's withdrawal from the project and the Spider-Man franchise was rebooted with The Amazing Spider-Man in 2012.
 Rhys Ifans portrays Dr. Curt Connors / Lizard in two Marvel films. This version is an Oscorp biologist and former partner of Richard Parker, whose research focused on genetically combining animal traits with humans to improve health. Connors is portrayed as a somewhat sympathetic, yet misguided individual, who is driven by the loss of his right arm and a desire to do genuine good, while his Lizard alter-ego is much more feral, but retains Connors' intelligence and eventually takes over his body. Additionally, this version of the Lizard does not wear clothes and has a less pronounced snout, giving him a more humanoid appearance.
 Connors first appears in the Sony film The Amazing Spider-Man (2012). Peter Parker finds Richard's notes and visits Connors to continue what he and Richard started. The two successfully formulate a serum together, which Connors injects himself with after being fired from Oscorp for refusing to rush into human trials. The serum regenerates Connors' lost arm, but eventually mutates him into the Lizard who goes on a rampage until Spider-Man intervenes. Escaping into the sewer, he reverts, develops an obsession with his abilities, builds a makeshift off-site lab, and experiments on himself further due to the chemicals affecting his mind. The Lizard discovers Spider-Man's secret identity, so he develops a mind of his own and asserts himself as the dominant personality while seeking to mutate all of New York into lizards like himself. However, Spider-Man foils his plan with Captain George Stacy's help, who is killed by the Lizard in the process, and cures him. With the Lizard's personality gone and his sanity restored, Connors saves Peter from plummeting off of Oscorp Tower and surrenders to the authorities. In the film's mid-credits scene, Connors is remanded to Beloit Psychiatric Hospital, where he speaks with a mysterious man regarding the Parkers' knowledge of him, who vanishes from the room.
 Ifans reprised his role in the Marvel Cinematic Universe (MCU) film Spider-Man: No Way Home (2021). Sometime after learning Peter's secret identity, Connors is transported to another universe, where he is found and imprisoned by Doctor Strange alongside other alternate universe-displaced supervillains and encounters its version of Peter Parker who offers to cure them and avert their original fates upon returning to their respective universes, although the Lizard is the most skeptical, believing there would be consequences and chooses to stay behind at a F.E.AS.T. truck rather than accompany Parker to Happy Hogan's apartment. But as Connors predicted, the Green Goblin convinces most of the villains to fight back instead. The Lizard joins Sandman and Electro in fighting Spider-Man and two alternate universe versions of himself, including the Lizard's version, before he is eventually defeated and cured by the second Parker. After reverting to his human form, Doctor Strange returns Connors and the other displaced individuals to their respective home universes.
 The Peter Parker incarnation of the Lizard makes a cameo appearance in a flashback in Spider-Man: Into the Spider-Verse. Spider-Woman defeats him and reverts back to Peter Parker who dies in her arms.

Video games
 The Lizard appears in Questprobe featuring Spider-Man.
 The Lizard appears in the Spider-Man (1991) arcade game.
 The Lizard appears as a boss in The Amazing Spider-Man (1990) and 
 The Lizard appears as a boss in Spider-Man vs. The Kingpin.
 The Lizard appears as a boss in The Amazing Spider-Man (1992).
 The Lizard appears as an optional boss in Spider-Man (1995). When he is defeated, he transforms back into Dr. Connors, though in the SNES version of the game, attacking Connors once he has been restored to normal will cause him to turn back into the Lizard, with more power than he previously had. In the Sega Genesis version, he will automatically transform into the Lizard after a short time, though he does not become invincible or stronger. He also appears as a mini-boss in the final level of the SNES version, where he cannot be attacked after turning back into Connors.
 The Lizard appears as a boss in Spider-Man: Lethal Foes.
 The Lizard makes a minor appearance in Spider-Man (2000), voiced by Dee Bradley Baker. He has been imprisoned by Venom to take control of his lizard-men minions and gives advice to Spider-Man on how to find Venom after encountering him.
 The Lizard appears as a boss Spider-Man 2: Enter Electro, voiced again by Dee Bradley Baker. When Spider-Man comes to Bio Tech to seek Curt Connors' help in learning more about the Bio-Nexus Device, he finds that Connors has transformed into the Lizard and is forced to cure him. Afterwards, Connors reveals that he was present when Electro stole the device and advises Spider-Man to search the lab of its creator, Dr. Watts, for more information.
 Curt Connors appears in the Treyarch version of Spider-Man 2, voiced by Joe Alaskey. Like the Sam Raimi film incarnation, this version is Peter Parker's science teacher at Columbia University and an old friend and colleague of Dr. Otto Octavius. Originally, the Lizard was supposed to have been included in the game, as evidenced by his prominent appearances in the game's promotional material, before he was suddenly removed. However, hints towards the Lizard were included in the final game, such as Doctor Octopus breaking Connors' right arm. In the Game Boy Advance and N-Gage versions of the game, the Lizard appears as a boss.
 The Lizard appears as a mini-boss in Marvel: Ultimate Alliance, voiced by James Arnold Taylor. This version is a member of Doctor Doom's Masters of Evil.
 Curt Connors / Lizard appears in the Spider-Man 3 film tie-in game, voiced by Nathan Carlson. This version is Peter Parker's science teacher who conducted secret experiments on himself with a lizard DNA serum, hoping to regrow his missing right arm. After transforming into the Lizard, he goes on to kidnap and convert numerous people into lizards as part of a plot to replace New York's population with reptiles. While he is thwarted by Spider-Man, the Lizard manages to escape. He is later hunted by Kraven the Hunter and Calypso before she uses a magic potion to transform him into the "Mega Lizard". After Spider-Man defeats Mega Lizard, he reverts to Connors and is taken to the hospital. Spider-Man later helps Connors atone for his actions as the Lizard by curing all the people he transformed. In the PS2, PSP, and Wii versions of the game, Connors plays a larger role, helping Spider-Man analyze a piece of his symbiote costume and treat Dr. Michael Morbius' vampirism.
 The Lizard appears as a playable character in Spider-Man: Friend or Foe, voiced by Roger L. Jackson. This version is an anti-hero who searches the Earth for a cure to his condition. After encountering Spider-Man in Egypt, the Lizard joins forces with him to stop an invasion of P.H.A.N.T.O.M.s created by Mysterio.
 The Lizard appears as a boss in the Wii, Nintendo DS, PS2, and PSP versions of Marvel: Ultimate Alliance 2, voiced by Marc Samuel. This version is one of several supervillains injected with control nanites.
 Curt Connors / Lizard appears as the final boss of The Amazing Spider-Man, voiced by Steve Blum. The game continues on from the events of the aforementioned film and sees a number of cross-species experiments Oscorp created using Connors' research escaping into Manhattan and infecting its population with a deadly virus. Spider-Man reluctantly releases Connors from prison to develop a cure, which they eventually succeed in doing. When Alistair Smythe begins destroying the city in his attempt to save it and strips Spider-Man of his powers, Connors reluctantly transforms into the Lizard to face him. After recovering his powers, Spider-Man helps the Lizard defeat Smythe, but Connors succumbs to the Lizard's consciousness and flees into the sewers. After defeating and curing the Lizard once more, Connors willingly returns to prison. Additionally, the Lizard becomes a playable character via the Lizard Rampage DLC pack.
 The Lizard appears in Marvel Super Hero Squad Online.
 Curt Connors / Lizard appears as a playable character in Lego Marvel Super Heroes, voiced again by Steve Blum. This version is able to switch between his human and reptilian forms at will.
 The Lizard appears in Marvel Heroes. He breaks out of prison alongside Calvin Zabo and make their way to the former's hidden lab at the Bronx Zoo. After Zabo becomes Mister Hyde, he injects the Lizard with his Hyde serum to strengthen him before combining their serums to infect the Bronx Zoo's water supply, resulting in hybrids of lizards and other animals being created.
 The Lizard appears as a boss in Marvel: Avengers Alliance.
 The Lizard appears as a boss in Marvel Avengers Alliance 2.
 The Lizard appears as a playable character in Marvel: Future Fight.
 Curt Connors / Lizard appears as a playable character in Lego Marvel Super Heroes 2.
 Curt Connors appears in the mid-credits scene of Spider-Man: Miles Morales, voiced by an uncredited voice actor. This version is a scientist working for Norman Osborn who monitors the latter's terminally ill son Harry Osborn who is kept inside a holding tank until a cure can be found for his illness. When Norman orders Connors to release Harry, the scientist initially objects, warning that it is too early and might be dangerous, but eventually and reluctantly does so.

Mierchandise
 The Lizard received a figure in Mego's "World's Greatest Super-Heroes" line.
 The Lizard received several figures from Toy Biz as part of the Spider-Man: The Animated Series tie-in line, Spider-Man Classics, and the Marvel Legends series.
 The Lizard received a figure in Hasbro's 2007 Spider-Man 3 film tie-in toyline based on his appearance in the video game of the same name.
 The Lizard received several mini-busts from Art Asylum and Bowen Designs. Additionally, the latter produced a statue of the Lizard.
 The The Spectacular Spider-Man incarnation of the Lizard received a figure from Hasbro.
 The Amazing Spider-Man incarnation of the Lizard received several figures and toys in Hasbro's The Amazing Spider-Man film tie-in toy line.

Miscellaneous
 The Lizard appears in Spider-Man: Turn Off the Dark played by Brandon Rubendall. This version was originally an Oscorp Industries scientist before the Green Goblin turns him into a member of the Sinister Six.
 The Lizard appears in the Marvel Universe: Live!. This version is a member of the Sinister Six.

Reception
The Lizard was ranked No. 9 on a listing of Marvel Comics' monster characters in 2015.

In 2022, CBR.com ranked Lizard 5th in their "10 Most Violent Spider-Man Villains" list.

Notes

References

External links
 Lizard at Marvel.com
 Ultimate Marvel's Lizard at Marvel.com
 Lizard at Marvel Wiki
 Ultimate Marvel's Lizard at Marvel Wiki
 Lizard's Profile at Spiderfan.org 
 Lizard at the Villains Wiki

Action film villains
Animal supervillains
Anthropomorphic reptiles
Characters created by Stan Lee
Characters created by Steve Ditko
Comics characters introduced in 1963
Fictional amputees
Fictional characters from Florida
Fictional characters with dissociative identity disorder
Fictional characters with superhuman durability or invulnerability
Fictional filicides
Fictional genetically engineered characters
Fictional herpetologists
Fictional human–animal hybrids
Fictional lizards
Fictional mad scientists
Fictional monsters
Fictional physicians
Fictional reptilians
Fictional geneticists
Fictional therianthropes
Marvel Comics animals
Marvel Comics characters who are shapeshifters
Marvel Comics characters who can move at superhuman speeds
Marvel Comics characters with accelerated healing
Marvel Comics characters with superhuman strength
Marvel Comics film characters
Marvel Comics hybrids
Marvel Comics male supervillains
Marvel Comics mutates
Marvel Comics scientists
Marvel Comics supervillains
Marvel Comics telepaths
Spider-Man characters
Villains in animated television series